Following is a list of parks, forests and nature preserves in the Louisville metropolitan area.

Louisville Metro (Jefferson County)

Frederick Law Olmsted Parks 

The Frederick Law Olmsted Parks (formerly called the Olmsted Park System) in Louisville was the last of five such systems designed by Frederick Law Olmsted.  All of the parks in this system are managed by Louisville Metro Parks.

Flagship
 Cherokee Park
 Iroquois Park
 Shawnee Park

Other parks
 Algonquin Park
 Baxter Square
 Bingham Park — Originally known as Clifton Park (Locals called it Coral Park)

 Boone Square
 Central Park
 Chickasaw Park
 Churchill Park
 Elliott Square
 Seneca Park
Shelby Park
 William B. Stansbury Park — Originally known as Third Street Playground
Tyler Park
 Victory Park
 Wayside Park
 Willow Park — Originally part of the main entrance to Cherokee Park

Parkways

 Algonquin Parkway
 Eastern Parkway
 Northwestern Parkway
 Southern Parkway
 Southwestern Parkway

Other parks managed by Louisville Metro Parks

Parks not managed by Louisville Metro Parks 

 Auburn Park (Jeffersontown)
 Beargrass Creek State Nature Preserve
 Blackacre Nature Preserve and Historic Homestead
 Bowling Park (St. Matthews)
 Brown Park (St. Matthews)
 Dayton Avenue Park (St. Matthews)
 Arthur K. Draut Park (St. Matthews)
 Fort Nelson Park
 Founder's Square
 Garvin Brown Nature Preserve
 Harrods Creek Park (Prospect)
 Jefferson Square
 Louisville Waterfront Park
 The Parklands of Floyds Fork:
 Beckley Creek Park
 Pope Lick Park
 Broad Run Park
 The Strand
 Turkey Run Park
 Riverfront Plaza/Belvedere
 Robison Park (Lyndon)
 St. Matthews Park/Community Center
 E. P. "Tom" Sawyer State Park
 Shively Park (Shively)
 Six Mile Island State Nature Preserve
 Skyview Park (Jeffersontown)
 Veterans Memorial Park (Jeffersontown)
 Warwick Park (St. Matthews)

Kentucky metropolitan counties outside Jefferson

Bullitt 
 Bernheim Arboretum and Research Forest

Meade 
 Otter Creek Outdoor Recreation Area — Operated by the Kentucky Department of Fish and Wildlife Resources

Nelson 
 Bardstown Community Park
 Dean Watts Park (Bardstown)
 My Old Kentucky Home State Park
 Jones Avenue Park (Bardstown)
 Woodson/Rogers Park (Bardstown)

Oldham 
 John T. Walsh Park (La Grange)
 Wendell Moore Park (Buckner)
 Wilborn Park (La Grange)
 Yew Dell Gardens (Crestwood)
 Creasy Mahan Nature Preserve (Goshen)
 Community Convention and Aquatic Center (Buckner)

Shelby 
 Clear Creek Park (Shelbyville)

Spencer 
 Taylorsville Lake State Park — includes Taylorsville Lake, which extends into Nelson and Anderson Counties.

Trimble 
 Milton City Park (Milton)
 Trimble County Park (Bedford)

Indiana metropolitan counties

Clark

Jeffersonville parks and recreation

 Bob Hedge Park
 Colston Park
 Connie Seller Park
 Highland Park
 John Wilcoxson Park
 Lansden Park
 Lottie Oglesby Park
 Meijer Little League Fields
 Oak Park
 Optimist Park
 Port Fulton Park
 Shannon Memorial Park
 Shirley Hall Park
 Vissing Park
 Warder Park
 Wathen Park

Clarksville parks and recreation

 Ashland Park
 Beechwood Park
 Cedar Park
 Colgate Park
 Gaskell Park
 Lapping Park
 Little League Park
 Midway Park
 Moser Park
 Parkwood Park
 Ray Lawrence Park

Others and state parks
 Perrin Park — Privately owned; located in Jeffersonville
 Charlestown State Park
 Clark State Forest
 Falls of the Ohio State Park

Harrison 
 Buffalo Trace Park
 Harrison-Crawford State Forest
 Hayswood Nature Reserve

See also 
 City of Parks
 Cityscape of Louisville, Kentucky
 Geography of Louisville, Kentucky
 List of attractions and events in the Louisville metropolitan area
 Louisville neighborhoods
 Louisville Zoo

References

External links 
 Louisville Metro Parks
 Olmsted Parks Conservancy
 Louisville Parks and Parkways System — The Cultural Landscape Foundation
 City Shaping: The Olmsteds & Louisville — Interactive documentary from The Cultural Landscape Foundation
 Oldham County Parks
 Jeffersonville Parks and Recreation
 Clarksville Parks & Recreation
 Shelby County Parks & Recreation

 
 Parks
Lists of parks in the United States by city